Protoneura sanguinipes is a species of damselfly in the family Protoneuridae. It is endemic to the Dominican Republic.  Its natural habitats are subtropical or tropical moist lowland forests and rivers. It is threatened by habitat loss.

Sources 

Protoneuridae
Insects of the Dominican Republic
Endemic fauna of the Dominican Republic
Insects described in 1987
Taxonomy articles created by Polbot